Thomas Vrabec (born October 22, 1966) is a retired Swiss professional ice hockey centre of Czech ancestry. He was born in Jablonec nad Nisou. In 1996 he had to abandon his career due to thrombosis. He was team captain of the SC Bern and the Swiss national team.

Achievements
1987 - NLA Champion with HC Lugano
1988 - NLA Champion with HC Lugano
1990 - NLA Champion with HC Lugano
1991 - NLA Champion with SC Bern
1992 - NLA Champion with SC Bern

International play
Thomas Vrabec participated in the following tournaments for the Swiss national team:

 2 A-World Championships: 1991, 1993
 2 B-World Championships: 1989, 1990
 2 Olympic Games: 1988 in Calgary and 1992 in Albertville

External links

1966 births
Sportspeople from Jablonec nad Nisou
ECH Chur players
HC Lugano players
Ice hockey players at the 1988 Winter Olympics
Ice hockey players at the 1992 Winter Olympics
Living people
Olympic ice hockey players of Switzerland
SC Bern players
Swiss ice hockey centres
Swiss people of Czech descent